The American Zionist Council (AZC) was an Israeli lobby group formed in 1949, which represented nine nationwide Zionist organizations in matters related specifically to Zionism, following the independence of Israel. It was founded as a tax-exempt umbrella organization of American Jewish groups, which focused on Israel and included the Zionist Organization of America (ZOA), Hadassah, and other Zionist organizations active in the United States. It acted as an umbrella group for public relations, outreach, and lobbying on Capitol Hill. Between 1951 and 1953, its Washington representative was Isaiah L. Kenen. Kenen organized the unincorporated American Zionist Committee for Public Affairs (AZCPA) in 1953. AZCPA was primarily a "public relations" organization, emitting numerous (but declining numbers of) news releases.

AZC's early years were characterized by bureaucratic struggle within Jewish and pro-Israel movements. In 1962 President John F. Kennedy and his brother Bobby, in the United States Attorney General, forced the AZC to register as a foreign agent. In doing so, they were barred from making monetary contributions to US officials.

Further reading
Bernstein, Marver H. Review: The Lobby: Jewish Political Power and American Foreign Policy by Edward Tivnan. American Jewish History, 79:2, 1989, pp. 286–89. 
Nelson, Nancy Jo (1980) The Zionist Organizational Structure, Journal of Palestine Studies, 10:1, 80–93, 
Shub, Louis. “Zionist and Pro-Israel Activities.” The American Jewish Year Book, vol. 52, 1951, pp. 110–25. 

Zionism in the United States
1949 establishments in the United States
Jewish organizations established in 1949
American Israel Public Affairs Committee